Flavogallonic acid dilactone is a hydrolysable tannin that can be found in Rhynchosia volubilis seeds, in Shorea laevifolia,  in Anogeissus leiocarpus and Terminalia avicennoides.

See also 
 Flavogallonic acid

References 

Hydrolysable tannins
Trihydroxybenzoic acids
Lactones
Catechols
Pyrogallols